Pierre Pribetich is a French politician, who, from 2007 until 2009, was a Member of the European Parliament representing East France for the Socialist Party. He was appointed following the resignation of Pierre Moscovici.

Parliamentary service
Member, Committee on Regional Development (2007-2009)
Member, Delegation for relations with the countries of Southeast Asia and the Association of Southeast Asian Nations (ASEAN) (2007-2009)
Member, Subcommittee on Security and Defence (2009)
Member, Committee on Foreign Affairs

References

Living people
1956 births
Socialist Party (France) MEPs
People from Roubaix
MEPs for France 2004–2009